The arrondissement of Nancy is an arrondissement of France in the Meurthe-et-Moselle department in the Grand Est region. It has 188 communes.

Composition

The communes of the arrondissement of Nancy, and their INSEE codes, are:

 Abaucourt (54001)
 Affracourt (54005)
 Agincourt (54006)
 Amance (54012)
 Armaucourt (54021)
 Arraye-et-Han (54024)
 Art-sur-Meurthe (54025)
 Atton (54027)
 Autreville-sur-Moselle (54031)
 Autrey (54032)
 Azelot (54037)
 Bainville-aux-Miroirs (54042)
 Bainville-sur-Madon (54043)
 Belleau (54059)
 Belleville (54060)
 Benney (54062)
 Bey-sur-Seille (54070)
 Bezaumont (54072)
 Blénod-lès-Pont-à-Mousson (54079)
 Bouxières-aux-Chênes (54089)
 Bouxières-aux-Dames (54090)
 Bouxières-sous-Froidmont (54091)
 Bouzanville (54092)
 Bralleville (54094)
 Bratte (54095)
 Brin-sur-Seille (54100)
 Buissoncourt (54104)
 Burthecourt-aux-Chênes (54108)
 Ceintrey (54109)
 Cerville (54110)
 Chaligny (54111)
 Champenoux (54113)
 Champey-sur-Moselle (54114)
 Champigneulles (54115)
 Chaouilley (54117)
 Chavigny (54123)
 Chenicourt (54126)
 Clémery (54131)
 Clérey-sur-Brenon (54132)
 Coyviller (54141)
 Crantenoy (54142)
 Crévéchamps (54144)
 Custines (54150)
 Diarville (54156)
 Dieulouard (54157)
 Dombasle-sur-Meurthe (54159)
 Dommarie-Eulmont (54164)
 Dommartemont (54165)
 Dommartin-sous-Amance (54168)
 Éply (54179)
 Erbéviller-sur-Amezule (54180)
 Essey-lès-Nancy (54184)
 Étreval (54185)
 Eulmont (54186)
 Faulx (54188)
 Ferrières (54192)
 Fey-en-Haye (54193)
 Flavigny-sur-Moselle (54196)
 Fléville-devant-Nancy (54197)
 Forcelles-Saint-Gorgon (54203)
 Forcelles-sous-Gugney (54204)
 Fraisnes-en-Saintois (54207)
 Frolois (54214)
 Frouard (54215)
 Gellenoncourt (54219)
 Gerbécourt-et-Haplemont (54221)
 Germonville (54224)
 Goviller (54235)
 Gripport (54238)
 Gugney (54241)
 Hammeville (54247)
 Haraucourt (54250)
 Haroué (54252)
 Heillecourt (54257)
 Houdelmont (54264)
 Houdemont (54265)
 Houdreville (54266)
 Housséville (54268)
 Jarville-la-Malgrange (54274)
 Jeandelaincourt (54276)
 Jevoncourt (54278)
 Jezainville (54279)
 Laître-sous-Amance (54289)
 Lalœuf (54291)
 Landremont (54294)
 Laneuvelotte (54296)
 Laneuveville-devant-Bayon (54299)
 Laneuveville-devant-Nancy (54300)
 Lanfroicourt (54301)
 Laxou (54304)
 Lay-Saint-Christophe (54305)
 Lebeuville (54307)
 Lemainville (54309)
 Leménil-Mitry (54310)
 Lenoncourt (54311)
 Lesménils (54312)
 Létricourt (54313)
 Leyr (54315)
 Loisy (54320)
 Ludres (54328)
 Lupcourt (54330)
 Maidières (54332)
 Mailly-sur-Seille (54333)
 Maizières (54336)
 Malleloy (54338)
 Malzéville (54339)
 Mangonville (54344)
 Manoncourt-en-Vermois (54345)
 Marbache (54351)
 Maron (54352)
 Marthemont (54354)
 Maxéville (54357)
 Mazerulles (54358)
 Méréville (54364)
 Messein (54366)
 Millery (54369)
 Moivrons (54372)
 Moncel-sur-Seille (54374)
 Montauville (54375)
 Montenoy (54376)
 Morville-sur-Seille (54387)
 Mousson (54390)
 Nancy (54395)
 Neuves-Maisons (54397)
 Neuviller-sur-Moselle (54399)
 Nomeny (54400)
 Norroy-lès-Pont-à-Mousson (54403)
 Ognéville (54407)
 Omelmont (54409)
 Ormes-et-Ville (54411)
 Pagny-sur-Moselle (54415)
 Parey-Saint-Césaire (54417)
 Phlin (54424)
 Pierreville (54429)
 Pompey (54430)
 Pont-à-Mousson (54431)
 Pont-Saint-Vincent (54432)
 Port-sur-Seille (54433)
 Praye (54434)
 Prény (54435)
 Pulligny (54437)
 Pulnoy (54439)
 Quevilloncourt (54442)
 Raucourt (54444)
 Réméréville (54456)
 Richardménil (54459)
 Rosières-aux-Salines (54462)
 Rouves (54464)
 Roville-devant-Bayon (54465)
 Saffais (54468)
 Sainte-Geneviève (54474)
 Saint-Firmin (54473)
 Saint-Max (54482)
 Saint-Nicolas-de-Port (54483)
 Saint-Remimont (54486)
 Saizerais (54490)
 Saulxures-lès-Nancy (54495)
 Saxon-Sion (54497)
 Seichamps (54498)
 Sivry (54508)
 Sornéville (54510)
 Tantonville (54513)
 Thélod (54515)
 They-sous-Vaudemont (54516)
 Thézey-Saint-Martin (54517)
 Thorey-Lyautey (54522)
 Tomblaine (54526)
 Tonnoy (54527)
 Vandières (54546)
 Vandœuvre-lès-Nancy (54547)
 Varangéville (54549)
 Vaudémont (54552)
 Vaudeville (54553)
 Vaudigny (54554)
 Velaine-sous-Amance (54558)
 Vézelise (54563)
 Ville-au-Val (54569)
 Ville-en-Vermois (54571)
 Villers-lès-Moivrons (54577)
 Villers-lès-Nancy (54578)
 Villers-sous-Prény (54579)
 Viterne (54586)
 Vitrey (54587)
 Vittonville (54589)
 Voinémont (54591)
 Vroncourt (54592)
 Xeuilley (54596)
 Xirocourt (54597)

History

The arrondissement of Nancy was created as part of the department Meurthe in 1800. Since 1871 it has been a part of the department Meurthe-et-Moselle.

As a result of the reorganisation of the cantons of France which came into effect in 2015, the borders of the cantons are no longer related to the borders of the arrondissements. The cantons of the arrondissement of Nancy were, as of January 2015:

 Dieulouard
 Haroué
 Jarville-la-Malgrange
 Laxou
 Malzéville
 Nancy-Est
 Nancy-Nord
 Nancy-Ouest
 Nancy-Sud
 Neuves-Maisons
 Nomeny
 Pompey
 Pont-à-Mousson
 Saint-Max
 Saint-Nicolas-de-Port
 Seichamps
 Tomblaine
 Vandœuvre-lès-Nancy-Est
 Vandœuvre-lès-Nancy-Ouest
 Vézelise

References

Nancy